Wayob is the plural form of  (or ), a Maya word with a basic meaning of 'sleep(ing)', but which in Yucatec Maya is a term specifically denoting the Mesoamerican nagual, that is, a person who can transform into an animal while asleep in order to do harm, or else the resulting animal transformation itself. Already in Classic Maya belief, way animals, identifiable by a special hieroglyph, had an important role to play.

In Maya ethnography 
In Yucatec ethnography, the animal transformation involved is usually a common domestic or domesticated animal, but may also be a ghost or apparition, for example 'a creature with wings of straw mats'. Some sort of 'devil's pact' seems to be implied. The Yucatec  has its counterparts among other Maya groups. In Tzeltal Cancuc, the  animal companion is considered a 'caster of disease'.
Other names found are:

In the Classic Period 

Many  animals are distinguished by (i) a shoulder cape or scarf tied in front; (ii) a splashing of jaguar spots or other jaguar characteristics; (iii) the attribute of an upturned 'jar of darkness'; and (iv) fire elements.
The Classic  include a far wider array of shapes than the 20th-century ones from Yucatán (insofar as the latter have been reported), with specific names assigned to each of them. They include not only many mammals (especially jaguars) and birds, but also apparitions and spooks: hybrids of deer and spider monkey, walking skeletons, a self-decapitating man, a young man within a fire, etc.  The animal  are likely to be transformative shapes of human beings, the walking skeletons (Maya Death Gods) more particularly of the  transformers.

The skeletal  prominent on a Tonina stucco wall carries the severed head of a defeated opponent.

See also 
Familiar spirit
Huay Chivo
Power animal
Tonal (mythology)
Tutelary spirit

Notes

References and bibliography 

 

 Reprint, London: Routledge, 2004.

Maya mythology and religion
Mexican mythology
American witchcraft